The surname Saults is a direct descendant of the Sultz families of Germany, Czechoslovakia, Poland and other bordering nations. The last name originally represented the steel and iron workers who built weapons and farm equipment around the time of World War I. After Germany was defeated in World War II and the exile of many German leaders including Jaeger Wolfgang Sultz, the Sultz family along with other fled to America, Canada, Austria-Hungary and France.

See also 
 Sulz (disambiguation), Sultz
 Soultz (disambiguation)

Germanic-language surnames